Swing Entertainment (Korean: 스윙 엔터테인먼트) is a South Korean privately held entertainment company founded in June 2018. The company is home to K-pop artists Kim Jae-hwan, A.C.E (co-managed with Beat Interactive), and Kep1er (co-managed with Wake One Entertainment). It also formerly managed I.O.I, Wanna One, Iz*One, X1, and Natty.

History
In June 2018, Stone Music Entertainment (CJ E&M main music label at this time) established the exclusive label Swing Entertainment for managing Wanna One since the latter ended their contract with YMC Entertainment, with Shin Dong-gil (who is the former manager under YMC Entertainment) as the label head.

Starting from June 1, Wanna One would be managed under Swing Entertainment, a new agency exclusively established for the group after their contract with YMC Entertainment expired. This new arrangement would still maintain the partnership with YMC.

Following the disbandment of Wanna One, Kim Jae-hwan signed with Swing Entertainment in 2019.

It was announced that 3 years after their disbandment, I.O.I was set to return in December 2019, potentially with all 11 original members, and will be co-managed by Swing Entertainment and Studio Blu. However, the comeback has been virtually canceled due to scheduling conflicts between the members and the ongoing Produce investigations.

After the finale of the survival program, Produce X 101, the final winners, X1, were managed by Swing Entertainment and made their debut on August 27, 2019. However, due to the Mnet vote manipulation investigation, the group disbanded on January 6, 2020.

In December 2019, YMC Entertainment founder and ex-CEO Cho Yoo-myung became the new CEO of Swing Entertainment, replacing his colleague Shin who became an executive director.

On March 10, 2020, it was announced that Swing Entertainment would co-manage Iz*One with sister company Off The Record Entertainment.  The group disbanded on April 29, 2021.

On April 6, 2020, Natty, a former contestant in Sixteen and Idol School, signed with Swing Entertainment,<ref>{{cite web |url=https://entertain.naver.com/now/read?oid=311&aid=0001131484 |title=[단독] '식스틴' 출신 나띠, 김재환 소속사 스윙 엔터 전속계약…데뷔 초읽기 |language=ko |trans-title='Sixteens Natty signs with Kim Jae-hwan's agency Swing Entertainment, countdown to debut |date=April 6, 2020 |website=Naver |access-date=April 7, 2020 |archive-date=June 30, 2020 |archive-url=https://web.archive.org/web/20200630075518/https://entertain.naver.com/now/read?oid=311&aid=0001131484 |url-status=live }}</ref> before leaving two years later in 2022.

On August 10, 2020, Kim Young-heum, recent contestant for The Voice of Korea season 3, signed with Swing Entertainment.

On February 5, 2021, it was announced that Swing Entertainment would co-manage A.C.E with Beat Interactive.

On October 25, 2021, it was announced that the winner of the Girls Planet 999'' group, Kep1er, would be managed by Swing Entertainment along with CJ E&M label Wake One Entertainment.  They made their debut on January 3, 2022, and the group's contract will last for two years and six months.

On October 29, Swing and Million Market signed a memorandum of understanding with the then-newly formed Big Planet Made, thus forming a strategic alliance and business agreement, with the label distributing BPM artists' albums.

Artists

Recording artists
Groups
 A.C.E (co-managed with Beat Interactive)
 Jun
 Donghun
 Wow
 Kim Byeongkwan
 Chan
 Kep1er (co-managed with Wake One Entertainment)
 Choi Yu-jin 
 Shen Xiaoting
 Mashiro Sakamoto
 Kim Chae-hyun
 Kim Da-yeon
 Hikaru Ezaki
 Huening Bahiyyih
 Seo Young-eun
 Kang Ye-seo

Soloists
 Kim Jae-hwan
 Kim Young-heum

Former artists
 Wanna One (2017–2019)
 Yoon Ji-sung (2017–2019)
 Ha Sung-woon (2017–2019)
 Hwang Min-hyun (2017-2019)
 Ong Seong-wu (2017–2019)
 Kang Daniel (2017–2019)
 Park Ji-hoon (2017–2019)
 Park Woo-jin (2017–2019)
 Bae Jin-young (2017–2019)
 Lee Dae-hwi (2017–2019)
 Lai Kuan-lin (2017–2019)
 I.O.I (2019) (co-managed with Studio Blu)
 Lim Na-young (2019)
 Kim Chung-ha (2019)
 Kim Se-jeong (2019)
 Jung Chae-yeon (2019)
 Zhou Jieqiong (2019)
 Kim So-hye (2019)
 Choi Yoo-jung (2019)
 Kang Mi-na (2019)
 Kim Do-yeon (2019)
X1 (2019–2020) 
 Han Seung-woo (2019–2020)
 Cho Seung-youn (2019–2020)
 Kim Woo-seok (2019-2020)
 Kim Yo-han (2019–2020)
 Lee Han-gyul (2019–2020)
 Cha Jun-ho (2019–2020)
 Son Dong-pyo (2019–2020)
 Kang Min-hee (2019–2020)
 Lee Eun-sang (2019–2020)
 Song Hyeong-jun (2019–2020)
 Nam Do-hyon (2019–2020)
 Iz*One (2018–2021) (co-managed with Off The Record Entertainment)
 Kwon Eun-bi (2018–2021)
 Sakura Miyawaki (2018–2021)
 Kang Hye-won (2018–2021)
 Choi Ye-na (2018–2021)
 Lee Chae-yeon (2018–2021)
 Kim Chae-won (2018–2021)
 Kim Min-ju (2018–2021)
 Nako Yabuki (2018–2021)
 Hitomi Honda (2018–2021)
 Jo Yu-ri (2018–2021)
 An Yu-jin (2018–2021)
 Jang Won-young (2018–2021)
 Son Ho-young (2019–2021)
 Natty (2020–2022)

References

External links
 

Companies based in Seoul
K-pop record labels
South Korean record labels
Talent agencies of South Korea
Entertainment companies established in 2018